Schlossberg or Schloßberg (German for Castle Mountain; usually a hill or mountain with a "castle" on it) may refer to:

Places
Schlossberg (Bavaria), a part of the municipality of Stephanskirchen in Bavaria, Germany
Schloßberg (Bopfingen), a suburb of the city of Bopfingen in Baden-Württemberg, Germany
Schlossberg (Brandenburg), a hill in Brandenburg, Germany
Schlossberg (Freiburg), a hill near the city of Freiburg im Breisgau in Germany.
Schlossberg (Graz), a hill in Graz, Austria
Schloßberg (Leibnitz), a town in the district of Leibnitz in Styria, Austria
Schloßberg (Pegnitz), a mountain in Bavaria, Germany
Schlossberg (Romania), the German name for the village of Chinari, in Sântana de Mureș, Romania
Schloßberg (Stolpen), a hill formed from basalt columns in Saxony, Germany, 
Schlossberg (Uri), a mountain in Central Switzerland
 Schlossberg, Bratislava, part of Podhradie, Bratislava
 Schlossberg, a hill near Husseren-les-Châteaux in Alsace (France) on which the ruins of les Trois Châteaux stand
 Schlossberg, a hill near Katzenthal in Alsace (France) on which the ruin of Château du Wineck stands
 Schlossberg, a hill near Kaysersberg in Alsace (France) on which the ruin of Château de Kaysersberg stands
 Schlossberg, a hill near Reinhardsmunster in Alsace (France) on which the ruin of Château d'Ochsenstein stands
 Schlossberg, a hill near Riquewihr in Alsace (France) on which the ruin of Château de Bilstein stands
Schlossberg Ulrichstein, a mountain in Hesse, Germany
Schlossberg von Tettelham, a mountain in Bavaria, Germany
Spieser Schlossberg, a mountain in Bavaria, Germany
Strahlenfelser Schlossberg, a mountain in Bavaria, Germany

Other uses
Schlossberg Textil, a Swiss manufacturer of bed linen

People with the surname
Edwin Schlossberg, American designer and husband of Caroline Bouvier Kennedy
Hayden Schlossberg, American screenwriter, director and producer
Jack Kennedy Schlossberg, American heir and son of Caroline Bouvier Kennedy and Edwin Schlossberg 
Julian Schlossberg, American motion picture, theater, and television producer
Rose Schlossberg, American actress and daughter of Caroline Bouvier Kennedy and Edwin Schlossberg 
Stephen Schlossberg, union organizer and undersecretary for labor-management relations under President Reagan
Tatiana Schlossberg, American author and daughter of Caroline Bouvier Kennedy and Edwin Schlossberg

See also
Schlossberg Castle (disambiguation)
Schlosberg, a surname
Castle Hill (disambiguation)
Castle Mountain (disambiguation)